Saint-Louis was a provincial electoral district in the Montreal region of Quebec, Canada.

It corresponded to the western half of Ville-Marie (downtown Montreal).

It was created for the 1966 election from parts of Montréal–Saint-Louis, Montréal-Outremont and Montréal-Mercier electoral districts.  Its final election was in 1989.  It disappeared in the 1994 election and its successor electoral district was Westmount–Saint-Louis.

Members of the Legislative Assembly / National Assembly

References
 Election results (National Assembly)
 Election results (QuebecPolitique.com)

Former provincial electoral districts of Quebec